New Henniker Bridge or New Bridge was a covered bridge in West Hopkinton, New Hampshire, which carried Henniker Road over the Contoocook River. The truss bridge was completed in 1863, and was the second bridge on the site. The original stone arch bridge was built in 1845 and was washed away by flood in 1852. The patent drawings show an all-timber truss with fixed intersection angles in the center of the span. At the ends of the span the angles of the diagonals vary. The end post is vertical, and each brace further from it is sloped a little more.

In 1935 the bridge had sustained damage during a flood and was repaired. The bridge was utilized until 1936 when a steel truss bridge was built adjoining it to the north and ready for traffic. The covered bridge was then destroyed.

References

Road bridges in New Hampshire
Bridges completed in 1863
Buildings and structures in Merrimack County, New Hampshire
Covered bridges in New Hampshire
1863 establishments in New Hampshire
Hopkinton, New Hampshire
Wooden bridges in New Hampshire
Lattice truss bridges in the United States